Palmadusta johnsonorum is a species of sea snail, a cowry, a marine gastropod mollusk in the family Cypraeidae, the cowries.

Distribution
This marine species occurs off the Marshall Islands.

References

 Lorenz, F., 2002. New worldwide cowries. Descriptions of new taxa and revisions of selected groups of living Cypraeidae (Mollusca: Gastropoda). Schriften zur Malakozoologie 20: 292 pp

Cypraeidae
Gastropods described in 2002